Gianluca Cherubini (born February 28, 1974 in Rome) is a retired Italian professional football player.

He played for 4 seasons (52 games) in the Serie A for A.C. Reggiana 1919 and A.S. Roma.

In 2006, he suffered a cerebral aneurysm during a game for Giulianova against Novara, which caused fears for his life. He recovered and later played for another season.

External links
Profile at Almanaccogiallorosso.it

1974 births
Living people
Footballers from Rome
Italian footballers
Serie A players
Serie B players
A.C. Reggiana 1919 players
A.S. Roma players
L.R. Vicenza players
S.S. Chieti Calcio players
Giulianova Calcio players
Competitors at the 1993 Mediterranean Games
Association football defenders
S.E.F. Torres 1903 players
Mediterranean Games competitors for Italy